are a fictional species of diminutive, sentient creatures and a recurring element of the Final Fantasy video game franchise, starting with their initial appearance in Final Fantasy III. They also appear in the Mana and Kingdom Hearts series. Moogles serve a variety of purposes in the various games in which they appear. They sometimes provide opportunities to record game progress or access shops; occasionally they assist in battle or may even become a playable character.

Moogles became a popular character amongst fans and critics, and are considered one of the mascots of Final Fantasy. Their original appearance and role was largely praised, although their change in design for the Fabula Nova Crystallis Final Fantasy sub-series was contentious.

Character design

Influences
Moogles were created by object designer Koichi Ishii, who later became the president of Grezzo. He stated they were based on a creature idea he drew in Elementary School based on an all-white koala. The creature could float by expanding their body and used their wings to control direction in midair. In an interview with Hiromichi Tanaka, the producer of Final Fantasy III, he stated that the Moogles were only meant to be a race of cave-dwelling people, and were not originally planned to be series mascots. Additionally, the Moogles were inspired by Dungeons & Dragons, specifically the "Infravision" ability to see in the dark used by non-human races such as elves and dwarves.

In Final Fantasy XIV, the "Good King Moggle Mog" boss was created after the fights for the Primals Leviathan and Titan had to be cut from the game due to the 2011 Tōhoku earthquake and tsunami, as the "Tsunami" and "Earthquake" moves they used would have been in poor taste.

Personality
Moogles typically have white fur, and an antenna protruding from the head with a small red or yellow ball (called a "pompom") at the end. They have small red or purple wings, and their ears are shaped like those of a cat or rabbit. A Moogle's favorite food is the Kupo Nut.

Moogles are frequently featured as creatures that may be summoned by the Summoner or Caller class of playable characters. Typically, moogles are lower-level summon spells acquired earlier in a given game.

Appearances

In the Final Fantasy series
The first appearance of a Moogle was in Final Fantasy III (1990), as the bodyguards of master wizard Doga. Final Fantasy VI (1994) was the first time a Moogle talked, was a playable character, and had a pom-pom on their head. Moogles appeared in almost every subsequent Final Fantasy game, with different roles and slightly differing appearances over time. They also appeared in spin-off games such as Final Fantasy Tactics and Crystal Chronicles. 

Moogle-themed attire has appeared in several of the games, with Final Fantasy X-2 including a wearable Moogle mascot costume for the character Yuna, and Lightning Returns: Final Fantasy XIII having a dress made of Moogle dolls. A Moogle mascot costume also appears in Final Fantasy XV'''s Moogle Chocobo Carnival.

In other video games
They first appeared outside of the Final Fantasy series in Secret of Mana (1993), where they have a different, tan color palette and look catlike in appearance. "Moogle" also became a status effect in the Mana series where the playable characters are turned into moogles for a period of time or until the effect is healed. In the Kingdom Hearts series, Moogles run the Synthesis workshops, where the player can use materials dropped by enemies to make items, equipment, and weapons. 

In merchandise and promotion
Like other series mascots the Chocobo and the Cactuar, the Moogle has been subject to numerous licensed merchandise connected to the Final Fantasy theme, sometimes in collaboration with third parties such as Universal Studios Japan and Sony Interactive Entertainment for the 2017 video game Everybody's Golf. Examples of merchandise which feature the Moogle as its iconography include stuffed toys, key chains, Christmas-themed cakes, wedding confectionary, and so on. 

Square Enix partnered with a Japanese bridal company to introduce a real-life Final Fantasy wedding service that includes a giant virtual Moogle. A giant Moogle bed was created as a contest reward for the Japanese convenience store Lawson.

 Reception Official Australian PlayStation Magazine stated that "nothing sums up the dichtotomy of cutesiness for adult players quite like a Moogle", calling them "cool little critters who wouldn't be out of place sitting atop your computer screen at work", but also "so sickeningly cute that thoughts turn to the business end of a hammer drill". Mike Fahey of Kotaku called the Moogle "my favorite video game characters ever" and "awesome and adorable", though criticizing their design in Final Fantasy XIII-2 as "gross". Jason Schreier of the same publication called Good King Moogle Mog "one of Final Fantasy XIV's most memorable bosses". However, that game's Fat Moogle mount, which released for 40 USD, was seen as "exorbitant" in price by fans.

Julia Lee of Polygon praised the Moogles of Final Fantasy Crystal Chronicles, calling them "adorable cat-like creatures", but criticized them for having English voice acting, saying it "ruin[ed] their tiny adorable appearance", and calling Mog, the player's Moogle helper, "annoying". Robert Ramsey of Push Square criticized the Moogle voice acting in Final Fantasy XIII-2 and Final Fantasy Type-0'', saying they "we're desperate for a return to Moogles that don't sound like they're helium enthusiasts."

See also 
 Chocobo
 Cactuar

References 

Final Fantasy characters
Video game characters introduced in 1990
Video game mascots
Video game species and races
Video game bosses
Mana (series)